Pauline Ng Po Lam (born 3 August 1980) is a Hongkonger retired footballer who played as a defender. She represented Hong Kong internationally.

International career
Ng represented Hong Kong at three AFC Women's Asian Cup qualification editions (2008, 2010 and 2014), the 2012 AFC Women's Olympic Qualifying Tournament and the 2014 Asian Games.

See also
List of Hong Kong women's international footballers

References

1984 births
Living people
Hong Kong women's futsal players
Hong Kong women's footballers
Women's association football defenders
Hong Kong women's international footballers
Footballers at the 2014 Asian Games
Asian Games competitors for Hong Kong